SS Waxholm may refer to:

 , a Swedish steamship built in 1881, and scrapped in 1956.
 , a Swedish steamship built, as SS Brevik, in 1909, renamed Waxholm in 1964, and destroyed by fire in 1978.

Ship names